The Kisan Mazdoor Praja Party (Farmer Worker People's Party), or Praja Party for short, was a political party of India. Established in 1951, it  merged with the Socialist Party to form the Praja Socialist Party in the following year. The Andhra unit of the party, however, revived the old party under the name "Praja Party" and lasted for a few more years.

History 
In June, 1951 Indian National Congress dissidents led by Jivatram Kripalani founded the KMPP. Two of its leaders, Prafulla Chandra Ghosh and Tanguturi Prakasam, had been chief ministers of West Bengal and of Madras respectively. It contested the 1951–52 Indian general election, the first such polls in India. The party nominated candidates in 145 constituencies across sixteen states, but won only ten seats, six candidates being elected from Madras state, and one each from Mysore state, Delhi, Uttar Pradesh, and Vindhya Pradesh, getting 5.8% of the votes. Kripalani himself lost from the (now defunct) Faizabad District (North West) constituency, but his wife, Sucheta Kripalani, was elected from New Delhi. It won 77 seats in the State legislative assemblies. In September, 1952 it merged with the Socialist Party to form the Praja Socialist Party.

In 1953, the Andhra State was separated from Madras, and Prakasam was offered Chief Ministership of the state by Indian National Congress. He split from the Praja Socialist Party and revived the old party under the name "Praja Party". In the 1955 election, Congress, the Praja Party, and Krishikar Lok Party (another splinter group of the original Praja Party) formed a united front against the Communists and won the majority.

See also 
Indian National Congress breakaway parties
Haripada Chattopadhyay

Notes

Bibliography
 
 
 
 

Political parties established in 1951
Agrarian parties in India
Defunct socialist parties in India
Indian National Congress breakaway groups
1951 establishments in India